"Pretty Little Dutch Girl" is a children's nursery rhyme, clapping game and jump-rope rhyme. 	It has a Roud Folk Song Index number of 12986.

Lyrics
The lyrics of the song vary considerably. British versions of this rhyme differ significantly, perhaps because many of the allusions in the rhyme were unknown to British children at the time. Common versions include:

I am a pretty little Dutch girl,
As pretty as I can be, be, be,
And all the boys in the baseball team
Go crazy over me, me, me.

My boy friend’s name is Fatty,
He comes from the Senoratti,
With turned-up toes and a pimple on his nose,
And this is how the story goes:

Variation 1

I am a pretty little Dutch girl
As pretty as I can be
And all the boys in the neighborhood
Are crazy over me

My boyfriend's name is Mello
He comes from the land of Jello
With pickles for his toes and a cherry for his nose
And that's the way my story goes

Variation 2

I am a pretty little Dutch girl,
As pretty as pretty can be,
And all the boys around the block 
Go crazy over me.

My boyfriend's name is Billy,
He comes from good ole Philly,
With a cherry on his nose
And ten fat toes,
And that's the way my story goes.

My boyfriend gave me peaches,
My boyfriend gave me pears,
My boyfriend gave me fifty cents
And kissed me on the stairs.

I gave him back his peaches,
I gave him back his pears,
I gave him back his fifty cents 
And kicked....him....down.....the.....stairs!

Variation 3

I am a pretty little Dutch girl,
As pretty as I can be.
and all the boys in the neighborhood
come chasing after me me me.

My boyfriend's name is Tony,
he comes from the land of bologna,
with a pickle on his nose and 3 sore toes
and that's the way the story goes!

One day he gave me peaches, 
one day he gave me pears,
one day he gave me 50 cents 
and took me to the fair!

After the fair was over,
I asked him to take me home,
he ran off with another girl 
and left me all alone!

I gave him back his peaches.
I gave him back his pears.
I gave him back his 50 cents,
and kicked him down the stairs!

Variation 4

I am a pretty little Dutch girl
As pretty as pretty can be.
And all the boys around the block
Go crazy over me.

I hate to do the dishes
I hate to do the chores
But I love to kiss my boyfriend
Behind the kitchen door.

One day while I was walking
I heard my boyfriend talking
To a pretty little girl
with strawberry curls

and this is what he said:
I L-O-V-E love you
All the T-I-M-E time
And I will K-I-S-S kiss you
In the D-A-R-K dark.

Variation 5 (Western Canada, 1960s)

I am a pretty little Dutch girl,
As pretty as pretty can be, be, be,
And all the boys on the baseball team
are chasing after me, me, me.

My father came from England,
My mother came from France, France, France.
My boyfriend came from the USA
to teach me how to dance, dance, dance.

My boyfriend gave me apples,
My boyfriend gave me pears, pears, pears.
My boyfriend gave me fifty cents
and kissed me up the stairs, stairs, stairs.

I gave him back his apples,
I gave him back his pears, pears, pears.
I gave him back his fifty cents 
and kicked him down the stairs, stairs, stairs.

...with a pickle on his nose and 3 sore toes,
that's the way it goes, goes, goes.

Variation 6
I am a pretty little Dutch girl
As pretty as pretty can be
And all the boys around my block
Go crazy over me!

I had a boyfriend, Patty
Who comes from Cincinnati
With 48 toes and a pickle on his nose
And this is the way my story goes...

One day when I was walkin'
I heard my boyfriend talkin'
To a pretty little girl with a strawberry curls
And this is what he said to her...

I L-O-V-E, love you
to K-I-S-S, kiss you
yes K-I-S-S, kiss you in 
the D-A-R-K dark boom boom!

Variation 7

I am a pretty little Dutch girl
As pretty as pretty can be
and all the boys in my hometown 
are crazy over me

My boyfriend's name is Chico
he came from Puerto Rico 
with a rubber nose
and 28 toes
and this is how my story goes

One day as I was walking 
I heard my Chico talking
to a pretty little girl
with strawberry curls
and this is what he said to her

I L-O-V-E love you
I K-I-S-S kiss you
I K-I-S-S kiss you 
in the D-A-R-K dark dark dark

Variation 8

I am a pretty little Dutch girl,
As pretty as can be, be, be,
And all the boys on the baseball team,
Go crazy after me, me, me!
One day they gave me peaches,
One day they gave me pears, pears, pears,
One days they gave me 50 cents and took me to the fair, fair, fair.
And when the fair was over,
I asked them to take me home, home, home,
They said they had another date and left me all alone, lone, lone.
I gave them back their peaches,
I gave them back their pears, pears, pears,
I gave them back their 50 cents and kicked them down the stairs, stairs, stairs!

Variation 9 (Northwest England, 2010s)

My boyfriend gave me an apple 
My boyfriend gave me a pear
My boyfriend gave me a kiss on the lips, and he threw me down the stairs

I gave him back his apple
I gave him back his pear
I gave him back kiss on the lips, and I threw him down the stairs

I threw him over London
I threw him over France
I threw him over the football pitch, and he lost his underpants

His underpants were yellow
His underpants were green
His underpants were black and white, and smelt like rotten cheese

Variation 10 (Austin, Texas 1960s) Given the actions that went with this, people assume this went through music halls.

I am a pretty little Dutch girl
As pretty as pretty can be  
And all the boys around the block
Are crazy over me.

My boyfriend's name is Harry.
He comes from Paris, France
With turned up toes and a pimple on his nose
And this is the way my story goes.

My boyfriend gave me apples,
My boyfriend gave me pears.
My boyfriend gave me fifty cents 
And took me to the fair.

One day as I was walking
I heard my boyfriend talking
To a pretty little girl with a strawberry curl
and this is what he said to her:

I L-O-V-E, love you.
I K-I-S-S, kiss you.
I K-I-S-S, kiss you 
On your F-A-C-E, face, face, face.

I gave him back his apples
I gave him back his pears
I gave him back his fifty cents
And threw him down the stairs.

I threw him over London.
I threw him over France.
I threw him over [substitute wherever here]
And he lost his underpants.

I have a little brother.
His name is Tiny Tim
I put him in the bathtub 
To see if he could swim

He drank up all the water
He ate up all the soap
He tried to eat the bathtub 
But it wouldn't go down his throat

Oh, Suzy called the doctor, 
Oh, Suzy called the nurse,
Oh, Suzy called the lady
With the alligator purse.

in walked the doctor, 
In walked the nurse,
In walked the lady
With the alligator purse.

Out walked the doctor, 
Out walked the nurse,
Out walked the lady 
With the alligator purse.

My boyfriend's name is Harry.
He comes from Paris, France
With turned up toes and a pimple on his nose
And this is the way my story goes.

Variation 11

I am a pretty little Dutch girl,
As pretty as can be,
And all the boys around the block are crazy over me, me, me.
My boyfriend's name is Chaim,
He comes from yerushalayim
With a pickle up his nose and three black toes,
And this is how my story goes.

One day when I was walking,
I saw my boyfriend talking
To a pretty little girl with a strawberry curl
And this is what he said to her:
I L-O-V-E love you,
I K-I-S-S kiss you.
And he fell in the lake,
And he swallowed a snake,
And he came out with a bellyache.

Variation 12 (Long Island, NY, 1970s - a clapping game)
I am a pretty little Dutch girl,
As pretty as pretty can be,
And all the boys around my block go crazy over me.
My boyfriend's name is Larry
He comes from Cincinnati
With his forty-two toes and a pickle in his nose
And this is what he said to me:
"I L-O-V-E love you
I K-I-S-S kiss you
I K-I-S-S kiss you on your 
F-A-C-E, F-A-C-E, F-A-C-E, face, face, face!"

Variation 13 (from Australia)
I am a pretty little Dutch girl,
as pretty as pretty can be be be.
And all the boys in the baseball team,
go crazy over me me me.

My boyfriends name is Steven, 
He comes from New Zealand.
With five fat toes and a pimple on his nose,
And this is how my story goes.

One day when I was walking,
I heard my boyfriend talking. 
To a pretty little girl with strawberry curls,
and this is what he said to her:
"I LOVE love you and I KISS kiss you"
So jump in the lake and swallow a snake,
and come out with a belly ache.

Variation 14 (from Tóg Sos CD, Ireland 2003)
I am a pretty little Dutch girl,
As pretty as I can be, be, be,
And all the boys in the baseball team
Go crazy over me, me, me.

My boyfriend’s name is Johnny,
He comes from Cincinnati,
With forty-eight toes and a pickle up his nose,
And this is how my story goes.

One day I went out walking,
And I heard my boyfriend talking
To a pretty little girl with strawberry curls
And this is what he said to her...
"I L-O-V-E love you,
I K-I-S-S kiss you,"
So I jumped in a lake and swallowed a snake
And now I have a bellyache!

Variation 15 (from USA, East Coast Early 2000s)
I am a pretty little Dutch girl,
As pretty, as pretty as can be
And all the boys in the baseball team
Go crazy over me, me, me.

My boyfriend’s name is Tommy,
He comes from Salami,
With a pickle up his nose,
And 55 toes
And that's the way my story goes!

Story told within the song
The rhyme (and at least some of its variants) tells the story of an extremely beautiful girl (of Dutch descent, hence the song's title) who is popular with boys (particularly around the neighborhood, block or the whole town) and has a rather unattractive boyfriend; some versions mention that the boyfriend dumps the pretty Dutch girl in favor of an even prettier girl. The Dutch girl is often depicted from illustration to illustration wearing traditional Dutch clothing, complete with ribbon-adorned long braids in her hair, wooden shoes and (occasionally exaggerated) Dutch cap.

Origins and distribution
The origins of the rhyme are obscure. The tune of the song is similar to "A Sailor Went to Sea" and "Miss Suzie Had A Steamboat" (though some notes are removed to account for the double-syllable words "pretty" and "little", and some notes are added in). The earliest record found so far is for New York around 1940. It seems to have spread over the US by the 1950s and reached Britain in 1959, where it was taken up very quickly across the country to become one of the most popular skipping rhymes among girls.

The tune is also used in British pubs as a drinking song in which a person is challenged by their companions to down their drink. This version goes like this:

We like to drink with (insert name here)
'Cause (insert name here) is our mate.
And when we drink with (insert name here)
He/she/they finish(es) in 8! 7! 6! 5! 4! 3! 2! 1!

Use in children's media
In the Wee Sing Video Series video Grandpa's Magical Toys, the song is represented and sung by a blonde-haired Barbie-like doll in Dutch traditional costume aptly named "Dutch Girl" (played by Jacqueline "Jacque" Drew) that enjoys jump-roping and is very concerned about the red ribbons tying her long braids together; she even gets very emotional when those ribbons come undone (she prefers them to be straight), but the three shrunken children in the movie (named Peter, David and Sara) talk her out of her moping and convince her that her then-straight ribbons aren't the reason why she played with them. Convinced, she then wears her ribbons undone throughout the rest of the movie, and her dress seem to be falling apart by the movie's end. She even says that Pretty Little Dutch Girl is "my [her] song" when she is introduced to the three kids, and she also has a tendency to prattle.
(5:01)

In the 1977 Australian animated film Dot and the Kangaroo, two hopping mice near the end of the waterhole scene sang a song about a bushgirl who is pretty to the tune of Pretty Little Dutch Girl after they see Dot touching the bandicoot and scaring it and made the bandicoot jump in the waterhole where Dot laughs on what she did and the hopping mice laugh as well, so they did the same thing Dot did. One of the hopping mice pushed the other one into the waterhole.

Notes

External links
Various parody versions and original text

English children's songs
American folk songs
Traditional children's songs
Clapping games
Skipping rhymes
American nursery rhymes
Songs about the Netherlands
Year of song unknown
Songwriter unknown